LDG may refer to

 Latitudinal diversity gradient
 The IATA code of Leshukonskoye Airport
 Libyan desert glass